Lepanthes acuminata is a species of orchid that occurs from Mexico to northern Venezuela.

References

External links 

acuminata
Orchids of Mexico
Orchids of Venezuela